The Play-offs of the 2011 Fed Cup Europe/Africa Zone Group III were the final stages of the Group III Zonal Competition involving teams from Europe and Africa. Using the positions determined in their pools, the seven teams faced off to determine their placing in the 2011 Fed Cup Europe/Africa Zone Group III. The top two teams advanced to Fed Cup Europe/Africa Zone Group II.

Promotion play-offs
The first placed teams of each pool played against the second-placed teams of the other pool in head-to-head rounds. The winner of each round advanced to the 2012 Europe/Africa Zone Group II.

South Africa vs. Egypt

Tunisia vs. Montenegro

Final Placements

They placed first and second in the same pool, and thus advanced to the promotional play-offs. Both teams, however, lost their matches and thus remained in Group II for 2013.

See also
Fed Cup structure

References

External links
 Fed Cup website

2011 Fed Cup Europe/Africa Zone